Naga (birthname: Nagarajan) is a director of Tamil films and TV Shows from Tamil Nadu, India. He is especially acclaimed for directing the hit television series Marmadesam series in the late 1990s. He made his debut as a film director in 2010 with the film Anandhapurathu Veedu. He is an alumnus of the Film and Television Institute of India, Pune.

Filmography

Television dramas

Director
 Thriller/Horror

 Rudraveenai ( Episodes 1 -21 on Sun TV )
 Marmadesam (Ragasiyam, Vidathu Karuppu, Edhuvum Nadakkum) (1996–2001)
 Chidambara Rahasiyam (2004–05) as the storywriter too.
 Adhu Mattum Ragasiyam
Yamirukka Bayamen (TV series)

 Comedy
 Ramany vs Ramany (1998–2000; 2001)
 Veettukku Veedu Looti (2003–05)

Cinematographer
 Kaiyalavu Manasu (1995)
 Marmadesam (Ragasiyam, Vidathu Karuppu) (1996–1998)

Films 
Director
 Anandhapurathu Veedu
Cinematographer
Gawaahi
Patthar Ke Phool

References 

Indian television directors
Tamil film directors
Living people
Year of birth missing (living people)